Pterolophia alternata is a species of beetle in the family Cerambycidae. It was described by Gressitt in 1938.

References

alternata
Beetles described in 1938